The 2008 NCAA Division II Football Championship Game was held on December 13, 2008 at Braly Municipal Stadium near the campus of the University of North Alabama in Florence, Alabama.

Teams 

The 2008 NCAA Division II National Football Championship playoffs involved 24 schools playing in a single-elimination tournament to determine the national champion of NCAA Division II college football.

The tournament began on November 15, 2008, and concluded on December 13, 2008 at Braly Municipal Stadium near the campus of the University of North Alabama in Florence, Alabama.

Game summary
The Minnesota Duluth Bulldogs won the school's first NCAA Division II football championship in a 21-14 win over the Northwest Missouri State Bearcats. Minnesota Duluth's quarterback Ted Schlafke threw  38-yard touchdown pass to Tony Doherty with 14 seconds left in the second quarter to give the Bulldogs a 7-0 lead. Later he threw a  5-yard touchdown midway through the third quarter to Issac Odim for a 14-0 lead. Odim ran for a 4-yard touchdown early in the fourth quarter for a 21-0 lead. Northwest Missouri's first score came on a 44-yard interception return by Aldwin Foster-Rettig cutting the score to 21-7. The Bearcats cut the lead to 21-14 as Raphael Robinson scored on a 2-yard touchdown catch with 1:36 left in the game. Minnesota Duluth recovered an onside kick attempt and ran out the clock.

Minnesota Duluth finished the season with a 15-0 record. Northwest Missouri ended the season with a 13-2 record and suffered its fourth consecutive loss in the Division II championship game.

Starting lineups

Scoring summary
1st Quarter
No scoring.
2nd Quarter
Minnesota Duluth - Tony Doherty  38 yard pass from Ted Schlafke (David Nadeau kick), 0:14 Bulldogs 7-0Drive: 6 plays, 75 yds, 1:03
3rd Quarter
Minnesota Duluth - Isaac Odim 5 yard pass from Ted Schlafke (David Nadeau kick), 6:32 Bulldogs 14-0Drive: 9 plays, 31 yds, 5:13
4th Quarter
Minnesota Duluth - Isaac Odim 4 yard run (David Nadeau kick), 13:43 Bulldogs 21-0Drive: 7 plays, 54 yds, 3:06
NW Missouri St -   Aldwin Foster-Rettig 44 yard interception return TD (Tommy Frevert kick), 8:03. Bulldogs 21-7
NW Missouri St -  Raphael Robinson 2 yard pass (Tommy Frevert kick), 1:36. Bulldogs 21-14Drive: 10 plays, 85 yds, 3:23

Statistical comparison

Source:

References

Championship Game
NCAA Division II Football Championship Games
Minnesota Duluth Bulldogs football games
Northwest Missouri State Bearcats football games
NCAA Division II Football Championship Game
NCAA Division II Football Championship Game